Zdzisław Ryszard Kapka (born 7 December 1954 in Kraków) is a retired Polish football player. He played mostly for Wisła Kraków and later briefly for Pittsburgh Spirit in the United States. He also played for the Polish national team (14 matches) and was a participant at the 1974 FIFA World Cup, where Poland won the bronze medal.

References

1954 births
Living people
Polish footballers
Polish expatriate footballers
Kapka, Zdzilsaw
1974 FIFA World Cup players
Ekstraklasa players
Wisła Kraków players
Pittsburgh Spirit players
Major Indoor Soccer League (1978–1992) players
Expatriate soccer players in the United States
Footballers from Kraków
Association football forwards
Polish expatriate sportspeople in the United States